Stichopus is a genus of sea cucumbers from the family Stichopodidae.

Description and characteristics 
Sources disagree about how many species should be classified in the genus. By 1922 there were about 20 described. Current species counts range from about 8 to 14. A number of animals have been moved to other genera, such as Apostichopus and Isostichopus.

These sea cucumbers are relatively large. One of the largest is S. vastus, which can reach 40 to 50 centimeters in length. They have soft, quadrangular bodies covered on all four sides with thick tubercles. Some of them can be quite variable, especially in their coloration. S. rubermaculosus, for example, can be light yellow to dark green with patches of various colors. Species also often differ in color from each other. One of the most distinctive is S. chloronotus, which is black, tinged with green or blue. Some of its body tubercles are tipped with orange. S. vastus looks "like a giant caterpillar" with yellow and green zebra stripes.

Many sea cucumbers are valued as food and as a source of medicine, and Stichopus is a commonly exploited genus. S. monotuberculatus is used for both food and medicine. Stichopus species are important in traditional medicine practices in Malaysia. There they are known as gamat, and they are used to make "gamat water" and "gamat oil", which are tonics for treating wounds, gastric ulcers, and pain. One species fished as gamat is S. horrens. This species is also harvested for food in Samoa. The parts considered edible are the viscera, especially the intestine. A fisher will take the cucumber from the water and place it in a bucket for a few hours to let it pass any sand from its gut. The fisher will then cut out its intestine and sometimes its respiratory system and gonads, as well, and release the still-living animal. The viscera are eaten raw and fresh, or bottled and sold in the community. Apparently, most cucumbers survive this treatment, at least in the short term.

There was a small fishery for S. herrmanni, but it crashed due to overfishing.

List of species 
The following species are recognised in the genus Stichopus:
 Stichopus chloronotus Brandt, 1835 - greenfish
 Stichopus fusiformiossa Woo in Woo et al., 2015
 Stichopus herrmanni Semper, 1868 - curryfish
 Stichopus horrens Selenka, 1867 - warty sea cucumber, peanutfish, flemfish, Selenka's sea cucumber 
 Stichopus monotuberculatus (Quoy & Gaimard, 1834)
 Stichopus naso Semper, 1868
 Stichopus noctivagus Cherbonnier, 1980 - night-wandering sea cucumber 
 Stichopus ocellatus Massin, Zulfigar, Hwai, Boss, 2002' - ocellated sea cucumber
 Stichopus pseudohorrens Cherbonnier, 1967
 Stichopus quadrifasciatus Massin, 1999
 Stichopus rubermaculosus Massin, Zulfigar, Hwai, Boss, 2002
 Stichopus vastus Sluiter, 1887

References

External links 

Stichopodidae